The Lyvia River is a river of Fiordland, New Zealand. It rises in the Dingwall Mountains and flows north-eastward into Doubtful Sound at Deep Cove.

See also
List of rivers of New Zealand

References

Rivers of Fiordland